Monkton is a village and parish adjoining Pembroke, Pembrokeshire, Wales. According to the United Kingdom Census 2001, the population was 1,688.

History
Monkton Priory, on a hill across the river from the Pembroke Castle, was founded in 1098 by Arnulf de Montgomery. Monkton Old Hall was originally a guest house for the Priory.

In 1833, the parish was part of the Hundred of Castlemartin, with a population of 1,128, and included Hundleton, Bentlass and other small settlements.

In 2000, Monkton was ranked the 14th most disadvantaged place in Wales and was given access to the Communities First programme. Pembrokeshire Action to Combat Hardship no longer has a base in the village, having closed due to repeated burglaries.

Education
Monkton has a primary school called "Monkton Priory Community Primary School" which has approximately 221 pupils. It also has a dedicated centre for gypsy traveller learners known as the "Monkton Priory School Project".

Worship
The church of St Nicholas was a priory church until the Dissolution of the Monasteries. It is a Grade I listed building. Now the parish church of St Nicholas & St John, Monkton it is part-Norman and part early English. There are two chapels.

Demographics
Monkton has a gypsy traveller site at "Castle Quarry" (formerly known as Catshole Quarry).

References

External links
Historical information and sources on GENUKI

Villages in Pembrokeshire